Jigar is a 1992 Indian Hindi-language martial arts film directed by Farogh Siddique. It was released during the Diwali weekend and proved to be a successful hit. The plot is inspired by the 1989 American film Kickboxer.

Plot 
Raju and Duryodhan are very good friends. Suman is Raju's love interest and is like a sister to Duryodhan. Duryodhan is a wrestler and works at a martial arts training school owned by Lal Bihari. Due to some misunderstanding between Raju, Duryodhan and Raju's sister, she is raped by Duryodhan. This angers Raju, but he fails in avenging his sister because Duryodhan is a wrestler. Raju starts training as a fighter under Baba Thakur. After being fully trained, he avenges all of his enemies. Duryodhan is killed in the ring itself, and Lal Bihari is killed by Suman.

Cast 
Ajay Devgan as Raj Verma "Raju"
Karishma Kapoor as Suman
Arjun as Duryodhan
Sukanya Kulkarni as Umaa, Raju's sister.
Ishrat Ali as Corrupt Police Inspector Manish Pandey
Salim Khan as Roshan Gupta
Gulshan Grover as Inspector Pradhan
Aruna Irani as Raju's mother
Jamuna as Doctor Ganga
Yunus Parvez as Seth
Goga Kapoor as Kaalia
Paresh Rawal as Lal Bihari
Shashi Kiran as Inspector Khan
Ajit Khan as Baba Thakur
Gurbachan Singh as Henchman of Duryodhan
Cheetah Yagnesh Shetty as Baba Thakur Assistant
Khosrow Khaleghpanah as Arjun

Soundtrack 
The music was composed by Anand–Milind while Sameer penned the songs. The song Pyar Ke Kagaz proved to be the biggest hit of the album. The album managed to feature in the top selling albums of 1992. Singers Kumar Sanu, Abhijeet, Pankaj Udhas, Udit Narayan, Sadhana Sargam, Mohammad Aziz & Kavita Krishnamurthy contributed their voice. After the dispute of Dil (1990) between Anand–Milind and Alka Yagnik, she stopped working with them for two years.

Box office 
The film was blockbuster and hit at box office.

References

External links 
 

Indian martial arts films
1990s action drama films
1990s Hindi-language films
1992 films
1992 martial arts films
Films about rape in India
Films scored by Anand–Milind
Films shot in Ooty
Indian action drama films
Indian boxing films
Indian rape and revenge films
Films directed by Farogh Siddique